Laureles Fútbol Club is a football club from Fray Bentos in Uruguay.

It was established on September 6, 1907. In 1913 it joined the Liga Departamental de Fútbol de Río Negro.

The "Laureles" is notable for its secular rivalry with the Club Atlético Anglo.

References

External links
 Laureles Sports Complex
 Pictures

Football clubs in Uruguay
Association football clubs established in 1907
1907 establishments in Uruguay
Fray Bentos
Sport in Río Negro Department